Clinton is an unincorporated community in Hunt County, Texas, United States.

History
Clinton was founded in 1887 through an agreement between landowner J. M. Massey and the St. Louis Southwestern Railway. The former sold his land in the area to the latter under the condition that they build a depot there; the depot, named Clinton for a railroad official, was built the same year. A post office opened the following year; it closed sometime between 1930 and the 1950s.

References

Unincorporated communities in Hunt County, Texas
Unincorporated communities in Texas